Yukako (written:  or ) is a feminine Japanese given name. Notable people with the name include:

, Japanese businesswoman
, better known as Anri Shiono, Japanese voice actress
, Japanese freestyle wrestler

Japanese feminine given names